John Lucy was a sailor and Medal of Honor recipient.

John Lucy may also refer to:

John A. Lucy, American linguist and psychologist
John Lucy (MP) for Gloucestershire